Adele Nicoll (born 28 September 1996) is a British shot putter, discus thrower and bobsledder. She has won multiple Welsh Athletics Championships events, and won the shot put event at the 2022 British Athletics Championships. She came second in the 2021–22 Bobsleigh World Cup event in Sigulda, Latvia alongside Mica McNeill. Nicoll was a reserve for the 2022 Winter Olympics, and competed at the 2022 Commonwealth Games.

Athletics career
Nicoll started competing in athletics for the Birchfield Harriers at the age of 14. She was not selected in the Welsh squads for the 2014 or 2018 Commonwealth Games; she only reached the B standard for the 2018 Games. 

Nicoll came third in the under-23s shot put event at the 2017 European Throwing Cup. As of 2021, she had won the previous eight shot put events at the Welsh Athletics Championship; her distance at the 2021 Welsh Athletics Championships was above the qualifying threshold for the 2022 Commonwealth Games. At the 2021 British Athletics Championships, Nicoll came third in the shot put event.

Nicoll came third in the shot put event at the 2022 British Indoor Athletics Championships, throwing a personal best distance of 17.02 metres. At the 2022 Welsh Athletics Championships, Nicoll won both the shot put and discus events. In June 2022, she was selected in the Welsh team for the 2022 Commonwealth Games in the shot put event. Later that month, she won the shot put event at the 2022 British Athletics Championships; she had previously finished in third place in seven editions of the championships. At the Commonwealth Games, Nicoll finished 8th in the shot put event with a distance of 17.30 metres.

Bobsleigh career
In 2020, Nicoll took up bobsleigh after being approached on Instagram by Mica McNeill, who had seen videos on social media of Nicoll exercising. She spent most of the 2020–21 season in training, and lost almost  of body weight in order to compete.

At the 2021–22 Bobsleigh World Cup, Nicoll competed in some events with McNeill, who also competed in events alongside Mica Moore and Montell Douglas. Nicoll, Moore and Douglas were all attempting to earn a place with McNeill for the 2-woman event at the 2022 Winter Olympics. In January 2022, Nicoll and McNeill finished second in the World Cup event in Sigulda, Latvia. It was the first time that a British woman had won a Bobsleigh World Cup medal for 13 years, and it was Nicoll's second World Cup event. That month, McNeill and Douglas were confirmed as Britain's selections for the Olympics; Nicoll travelled to the Games as a reserve. Two weeks after the Olympics, she attended a bobsleigh driving school in Lake Placid, New York, US. In the 2022–23 season, Nicoll started working as a pilot, in the monobob event.

Personal life
Nicoll is from Welshpool, Wales. She attended Welshpool High School, and later studied clinical neuroscience at Cardiff Metropolitan University, graduating in 2020.

References

External links
 
 Welsh Athletics Profile

1996 births
People from Welshpool
Sportspeople from Powys
Living people
British female bobsledders
Birchfield Harriers
Welsh female discus throwers
Welsh female shot putters
Alumni of Cardiff Metropolitan University
Commonwealth Games competitors for Wales
Athletes (track and field) at the 2022 Commonwealth Games